Mana Mountain is a prominent ice-free mountain bordering the south side of Frostlendet Valley about  southwest of Møteplassen Peak, in the Borg Massif of Queen Maud Land, Antarctica. It was mapped and named by Norwegian cartographers from surveys and air photos by the Norwegian–British–Swedish Antarctic Expedition (1949–52).

References

Mountains of Queen Maud Land
Princess Martha Coast